Glycodelin (GD) also known as human placental protein-14 (PP-14) progestogen-associated endometrial protein (PAEP) or pregnancy-associated endometrial alpha-2 globulin is a glycoprotein that inhibits cell immune function and plays an essential role in the pregnancy process. In humans is encoded by the PAEP gene.

Human endometrium synthesizes several proteins under the influence of progesterone. Of these proteins, glycodelin is of particular interest. It is synthesized by the endometrial glands in the luteal phase of menstrual cycle.

The temporal and spatial expression of GD in the female reproductive tract combined with its biological activities suggest that this glycoprotein probably plays an essential physiological role in the regulation of fertilization, implantation and maintenance of pregnancy.

Structure 

Glycodelin is codified by 180 amino acid but it is thought that 18 of these are supposed signals peptides. The molecular weight of GD is 20,555, while its mature form is estimated to weigh 18,787. It is encoded by a 1-kilobase-pair mRNA that is expressed in human secretory endometrium and decidua but not in postmenopausal endometrium, placenta, liver, kidney, and adrenals. 
The four cysteinyl residues (positions 66, 106, 119, and 160) responsible for intramolecular disulfide bridges in lactoglobulins are all conserved in GD. Southern blot analysis of human DNA suggested that GD gene sequences compass some 20 kilobase pairs of the human genomic DNA.

N-terminal amino acid sequence 

The N-terminal amino acid sequence of glycodelin is M D I P Q T K Q D L E L P K L A G T W H S M. This sequence can be compared with horse, sheep, goat, bovine and buffalo beta-lactoglobulin. For example, there are 13 identities out of 22 possible matches with horse beta-lactoglobulin.

PAEP gene 
This gene is a member of the kernel lipocalin superfamily whose members share relatively low sequence similarity but have highly conserved exon-intron structure and three-dimensional protein folding. The PAEP  gene is clustered on the long arm of chromosome 9 and encodes for GD protein. It is mainly expressed in 60 organs, but reaches its highest expression level in the decidua.

Function 
GD is the most important protein secreted in the endometrium during the mid-luteal phase of the menstrual cycle and during the first semester of pregnancy. Four distinct forms of glycoprotein, with identical protein backbones but different glycosylation profiles, are found in amniotic fluid, follicular fluid and seminal plasma of the reproductive system. These glycoproteins have distinct and essential roles in regulating a uterine environment suitable for pregnancy and in the timing and occurrence of the appropriate sequence of events in the fertilization process.

Glycodelin-A 
In the female genital tract is mainly expressed in EECs (cultured endometrial epithelial cells) and secreted into the amniotic fluid, endometrium/decidua and maternal serum. Glycodelin-A has contraceptive and immunosuppressive functions, due to the fact that suppresses Natural Killer cells, achieving the prevention of the maternal rejection of the fetus at the fetromaternal interface. It has a molecular weight of 18.78 KDa determined from the cDNA sequence.

Glycodelin-S 
Is secreted from seminal vesicles to the seminal fluid. A number of alternatively spliced transcript variants have been observed at this locus, but the full-length nature of only two, each encoding the same protein, has been determined. During the passage of the sperm through the cervix, glycodelin S is de-glycosylated and dissociates from the sperm, allowing the sperm to mature.

Glycodelin-F 
Is secreted by granulosa cells into the follicular fluid. Glycodelin-F reduces the blinding of spermatozoa to the zona pellucida which is mainly expressed in the ovary, and synthesised in the granulosa cells, has a function in principle similar to that of Glycodelin-A. It also binds the sperm head, thereby inhibiting acrosome reaction and sperm-egg binding. Upon de-glycosilation, glycodelin F dissociates from the sperm and sperm-egg binding is possible. The de-glycosilation takes place during the passage of the sperm through the corona cell layer. Glycodelin F is thereby important to prevent a premature acrosome reaction.

Glycodelin-C 
Found in Cumulus Oophorus, stimulates binding of the spermatozoa to the zona pellucida. First, cumulus cells reduce the spermatozoa-zona binding inhibitory activity of follicular fluid probably by taking up and converting glycodelin-A and glycodelin-F into glycodelin-C. Second, spermatozoa have enhanced zona bindig ability after penetrating through the cumulus oophorus. Glycodelin-C is responsible for the latter observation.

Level concentrations 
PP-14 is found in the oocyte and in the sperm. In men, the concentration of this protein in seminal plasma is higher than those in serum. In women, the levels in follicular fluid exceed those of non-pregnant women.

·Seminal plasma:

PP-14 is a significant protein constituent in most seminal plasma samples of men; sometimes comprising over 2.5% of the total protein content. The concentration of PP-14 in seminal plasma from men with oligospermia is in the reference range of this protein derived from values measured in normal men. However, vasectomized men concentrations are less than normal.

·Women's tissues and body fluids:

In serum of non-pregnant women, the concentration of PP-14 is approximately 15-40 µg/L.

In normal pregnancy: 

The concentrations of PP-14 in pregnancy serum are comparable with hCG (Human Chorionic Gonadotropin). Among all the placental proteins, the amniotic fluid PP-14 concentration is the most outstanding as decidua is a source of this protein.

Future clinical applications 

Placental Protein 14 has some clinical applications:

1. Biomarker of premature rupture of membranes

Premature rupture of membranes is a common pregnancy complication, taking into account that the current method does not satisfy the medical community, some researches have determined a new method: the analysis of placental protein in the maternal plasma and vaginal fluid. The results of these studies have shown that PP-14's concentration increased in the case of premature rupture of membranes. So this study conclude that PP-14 is an excellent biomarker with a sensibility of 100% and a specificity of 87,5%.

2. Biomarker in in vitro fertilization process

PP-14 is known to be a great marker to predict the outcome of in vitro fertilization and the embryo transfer cycle. Some studies have shown that the serum concentration of Placental Protein 14 was highly increased after the embryo transfer cycle, and they conclude that PP-14 might be an excellent marker to predict the endometrial receptivity.

References

Further reading 

 
 
 
 
 
 
 
 
 
 
 
 
 
 
 
 
 

Lipocalins